The 2013–14 Macedonian First League was the 22nd season of the Macedonian First Football League, the highest football league of Macedonia. Vardar are the defending champions after winning their seventh Macedonian championship at the end of the 2012–13 season. It began on 4 August 2013 and ended on 18 May 2014. This was the final season with 12 teams, because the Football Federation of Macedonia approved reducing the league to 10 teams. Therefore, 4 teams was directly relegated.

Promotion and relegation

Participating teams

Personnel and kits

Note: Flags indicate national team as has been defined under FIFA eligibility rules. Players may hold more than one non-FIFA nationality.

League table

Results 
Every team will play three times against each other team for a total of 33 matches. The first 22 matchdays will consist of a regular double round-robin schedule. The league standings at this point will then be used to determine the games for the last 11 matchdays.

Matches 1–22

Matches 23–33

Season statistics

Top scorers

 Players whose names are written in italic letters played only in the first part of the League

See also
2013–14 Macedonian Football Cup
2013–14 Macedonian Second Football League
2013–14 Macedonian Third Football League

References

External links
Football Federation of Macedonia 
MacedonianFootball.com 

Macedonia
1
2013-14